The men's coxed four rowing competition at the 1980 Summer Olympics took place at Krylatskoye Sports Complex Canoeing and Rowing Basin, Moscow, Soviet Union. The event was held from 20 to 27 July. There were 12 boats (60 competitors) from 12 nations, with each nation limited to a single boat in the event. The event was won by East Germany, the nation's first victory after three consecutive silver medals since it began competing separately in 1968. Defending champions the Soviet Union finished second, while Poland's bronze medal was the first medal in the men's coxed four for that nation since 1932. Twin brothers Ullrich and Walter Dießner became the sixth and seventh men to earn two medals in the event, as they had also competed on the 1976 East German silver medal team.

Background
This was the 16th appearance of the event. Rowing had been on the programme in 1896 but was cancelled due to bad weather. The coxed four was one of the four initial events introduced in 1900. It was not held in 1904 or 1908, but was held at every Games from 1912 to 1992 when it (along with the men's coxed pair) was replaced with the men's lightweight double sculls and men's lightweight coxless four.

The three nations on the podium at the 1979 World Rowing Championships had been the strongest nations in the event for most of the 1970s; they would have been favoured to reach the podium again at the 1980 Games but did not compete due to a boycott. West Germany were medalists at the 1976 Olympics and 1974, 1975, 1977, 1978, and 1979 World Championships but without a victory since the 1972 Olympics. This left defending Olympic champions the Soviet Union (silver in 1979 Worlds) and three-time Olympic runners-up (and three-time reigning World Champions) East Germany as the two favourites.

No nations made their debut in the event. Switzerland made its ninth appearance, most among nations competing in 1980 though behind the absent United States (13 appearances), Italy (12), and France (11).

Competition format
The coxed four event featured five-person boats, with four rowers and a coxswain. It was a sweep rowing event, with the rowers each having one oar (and thus each rowing on one side). The competition used the 2000 metres distance that became standard at the 1912 Olympics and which has been used ever since except at the 1948 Games.

With only 12 boats, the event shrank from a four-round competition in prior Games to a three-round tournament in 1980.

 Semifinals: Two heats of 6 boats each. The top boat in each heat (2 total) advanced directly to Final A. The remaining boats (10 total) went to the repechage.
 Repechage: Two heats of 5 boats each. The top two boats in each heat (4 total) rejoined the semifinal winners in Final A. The other boats (6 total) went to Final B.
 Final: Two finals. Final A consisted of the top 6 boats. Final B placed boats 7 through 12.

Schedule
All times are Moscow Time (UTC+3)

Results

Semifinals
Winner of each heat advanced to Final A. The remaining teams must compete in repechage for the remaining spots in Final A.

Semifinal 1

Semifinal 2

Repechage
The top two teams in each repechage heat qualified for Final A. The remainder went to Final B (out of medal contention).

Repechage heat 1

Repechage heat 2

Finals

Final B

Final A

References

Sources

Rowing at the 1980 Summer Olympics
Men's events at the 1980 Summer Olympics